The 1928 Auburn Tigers football team represented Auburn University in the 1928 college football season. The Tigers' were led by head coach George Bohler in his first season and finished the season with a record of 1–8 overall and 0–7 in Southern Conference (SoCon) play.

Schedule

References

Auburn
Auburn Tigers football seasons
Auburn Tigers football